Thado Hsinhtein (also known as Athinkhaya of Tagaung) was governor of Sagaing, and the father of King Thado Minbya of Ava. The chronicles do not specify his exact lineage except that he was of Tagaung royalty. But according to G.E. Harvey, a British colonial period historian, he was more probably an ethnic Shan noble of Tagaung, who claimed descent from the ancient Tagaung royalty. The Zatadawbon Yazawin chronicle lists him as the 14th ruler of Tagaung.

Moreover, the chronicles do not say that he was governor of Sagaing. It was per an inscription dedicated by his daughter Queen Shin Saw Gyi and her husband King Swa Saw Ke of Ava on 26 June 1398. The inscription refers to him as Athincha (Athinkhaya), governor of Sagaing. Since Sagaing was the capital of Sagaing Kingdom, his "governorship" of Sagaing may have been a mere mayoralty. It may have been a titular office created to suit his status as the husband of Princess Soe Min Kodawgyi, the daughter of the founder of the kingdom.

Notes

References

Bibliography
 
 
 
 

Sagaing dynasty